Li Jian (Chinese: 李健; born 9 March 1985 in Shenyang, Liaoning) is a Chinese football player who currently plays for China League One side Nei Mongol Zhongyou.

Club career
In 2004, Li Jian started his professional footballer career with Shenyang Ginde in the Chinese Super League. He would eventually make his league debut for Shenyang on 3 August 2005 in a game against Beijing Guoan.
In February 2009, Li transferred to China League One side Shenyang Dongjin.
In February 2013, Li transferred to China League One side Harbin Yiteng on a free transfer.

In February 2018, Li transferred to China League One side Nei Mongol Zhongyou.

Career statistics 
Statistics accurate as of match played 31 December 2019.

References

External links
 

1985 births
Living people
Chinese footballers
Footballers from Shenyang
Changsha Ginde players
Shenyang Dongjin players
Zhejiang Yiteng F.C. players
Inner Mongolia Zhongyou F.C. players
Chinese Super League players
China League One players
Association football defenders
21st-century Chinese people